Patom may refer to:
Patom Highlands, in East Siberia
Patom crater
Big Patom River
Bolshoy Patom (village)
Patom Theory